Mirognathus normani, Norman's smooth-head, is a species of slickhead native to the north-east and western Atlantic Ocean.  It is the only described species in its genus.  This species grows to a length of  SL.

References
 

Alepocephalidae
Monotypic fish genera
Fish of the Atlantic Ocean
Fish described in 1951